150 High Street, Stratford, also known as the Stratford Halo, is a 43-storey 135 m (443 ft) high residential tower in Stratford, London. It began construction in 2008 and was completed in 2013. As of 2019, it is the 46th tallest structure in London.

Architecture 
The development was designed by Stock Woolstencroft Architects.

The tower, rising to 43 stories, has a blue and purple exterior cladding. The development is accompanied by two medium rise buildings of 7 and 10 stories. It features three enclosed multi-storey sky gardens.

In 2014, The Guardian included it in their list of "Horror storeys: the 10 worst London skyscrapers". Others in the list included 20 Fenchurch Street (also known as "The Walkie Talkie") and the Vauxhall Tower.

See also 
 List of tallest buildings and structures in London

References 

Residential skyscrapers in London